The Brickfield is a 1964 novel by the British writer L.P. Hartley. An elderly author dictates his memoirs, recalling his youthful years. It was followed by a sequel The Betrayal in 1966.

References

Bibliography
  Dinah Birch & Margaret Drabble. The Oxford Companion to English Literature. OUP Oxford, 2009.

1964 British novels
Novels by L. P. Hartley
Hamish Hamilton books